Richard Stafford may refer to:
 Richard Stafford (pioneer), land speculator and pioneer of Hampshire County, West Virginia
 Richard Stafford, 1st Baron Stafford of Clifton, English soldier and diplomat
 Dick Stafford, English rugby union player